Thomas de Cottingham ( 1300 – 1370) was an English-born cleric and judge who held the office of Master of the Rolls in Ireland.

He took his name from his birthplace, Cottingham, in the East Riding of Yorkshire. He served as a clerk in the English Chancery for more than 30 years, and was Keeper of the Great Seal in 1349. He held the livings of several parishes, of which the names of three are known for certain: these are St. Mary the Great, Cambridge, St. Andrew, Holborn (1343), and Ashby St Mary, Norfolk.

In 1356 he became Master of the Rolls in Ireland. He was clearly expected by his superiors to find it a thankless task since he was promised preferment both for his past services and "the labours which he would have to endure". He was promoted to the rank of clerk of the first degree in Chancery, and subsequently became a Master in Chancery, but it does not seem that he ever received any substantial reward for his services in Ireland.

He did not lack friends in the Dublin Government, and in 1356, during a period of confusion about clerical promotions, he was appointed joint prebendary of Kilmolran and Desart, in the Diocese of Lismore. However, his opponents objected to the appointment as irregular and in 1357 King Edward III cancelled it.

He was at Westminster, in attendance on the King, in  February 1369: the Gascon Rolls note briefly that he "received the attorneys"  He died in 1370.

References

Sources

People from Cottingham, East Riding of Yorkshire
1300s births
1370 deaths
Masters of the Rolls in Ireland